Abolfazl Qassemi was an Iranian politician affiliated with the National Front, and once head librarian of University of Tehran.

Amidst Iranian Revolution, Qassemi succeeded Shapour Bakhtiar as the leader of Iran Party and was elected to the Parliament in 1980 legislative election. However, he was denied to take his seat on the grounds that he was a member of the SAVAK, while he denied the accusation. In November 1981, Islamic Revolutionary Court convicted Qassemi of collaboration with 1980 coup d'état attempt and sentenced him to life imprisonment.

References 

National Front (Iran) politicians
Iran Party politicians
1921 births
1993 deaths
Iranian elected officials who did not take office
Iranian librarians
People from Dargaz